(born 9 May 1968) is a Japanese former ski jumper. He is best remembered for a meltdown at the 1994 Winter Olympics in Lillehammer, which cost the Japanese national team a victory, and his subsequent redemption at the 1998 Winter Olympics in Nagano; the latter of which led to him being affectionately called "Happy Harada".

Career
At the 1994 games, the Japanese team had a nearly insurmountable lead heading into the last jump of the large hill. Harada, the team's anchor, had jumped 122 meters in his previous attempt and needed only 105 meters in his final jump to clinch the gold for Japan. His jump was just shy of 97,5 meters and dropped Japan to second, with the gold going to the German team.

Four years later Harada would again have his chance to contribute a gold for his team, this time in his home country. His first jump of 79.5 meters knocked his team from first to fourth and brought back memories of Lillehammer. Then, on his second attempt he delivered an Olympic-record tying 137 meter jump. His teammate Kazuyoshi Funaki would then close out the event with a 125 meter jump, clinching the first Olympic ski jumping team gold medal for Japan.  

Along with the team gold, Harada also captured bronze in Nagano in the individual large hill after a 136 meter final jump that pushed up him from sixth to third.

Harada has competed in five of the Olympic Games. In addition to the Lillehammer and Nagano games, he competed in Albertville in 1992, Salt Lake City in 2002 and Turin in 2006.

He is a two-time FIS Nordic World Ski Championships winner (1993: individual normal hill, 1997: individual large hill), and also won three silvers (1997: Individual normal hill, 1997, 1999: Team large hill) and one bronze (1999: Individual normal hill) as well.

Olympic normal hill individual competition in Pragelato on 11 February 2006 was the last highly ranked official event where he participated - who won 2 Olympic medals in Nagano and 1 in Lillehammer - and it was after over 3 years break from participating in Ski jumping World Cup. Unfortunately for him, he was disqualified in the qualifying and did not compete in the final. Later he started only in FIS Cup event in Sapporo.

On July 12, 2006, Harada was appointed Ambassador to the 2007 FIS Nordic World Ski Championships in Sapporo, Japan by the organizing committee. The 2007 Championships ran February 22-March 4, 2007.

World Cup

Standings

Wins

References

External links

FIS Announcement on Ambassador Appointment
2007 Nordic World Skiing Championship announcement

1968 births
Ski jumpers at the 1992 Winter Olympics
Ski jumpers at the 1994 Winter Olympics
Ski jumpers at the 1998 Winter Olympics
Ski jumpers at the 2002 Winter Olympics
Ski jumpers at the 2006 Winter Olympics
Japanese male ski jumpers
Living people
Olympic ski jumpers of Japan
People from Hokkaido
Olympic silver medalists for Japan
Olympic gold medalists for Japan
Olympic bronze medalists for Japan
Olympic medalists in ski jumping
FIS Nordic World Ski Championships medalists in ski jumping
Medalists at the 1998 Winter Olympics
Medalists at the 1994 Winter Olympics
Ski jumpers at the 2003 Asian Winter Games